Samos 3 was an American reconnaissance satellite which was lost in a launch failure in 1961. It was an early electro-optical reconnaissance spacecraft, meaning that it transmitted images to receiving stations on Earth rather than returning them in a film capsule, and was to have been operated as part of the Samos programme. Samos 3 was the only Samos-E2 spacecraft to be launched.

The launch of Samos 3 occurred at 19:28 UTC on 9 September 1961. An Atlas LV-3A Agena-B rocket was used, flying from Launch Complex 1-1 at the Point Arguello Naval Air Station. At the moment of liftoff, one of the launch tower umbilicals detached 0.21 seconds late. This tripped a switch in the Atlas and caused it to change from internal to external power. The booster's engines shut off and it fell back onto the pad and exploded, destroying the satellite and causing extensive pad damage. Damage to SLC3 mainly affected electrical and plumbing components and repair work began almost immediately. The pad was back online to host the launch of Samos 4 in November. Samos 3 was the last DOD-related launch to be unclassified, and afterwards, much greater secrecy would be put around such flights.

References

Spacecraft launched in 1961
Satellite launch failures